Jang Dae-hyeon (born February 11, 1997), better known mononymously as Daehyeon, is a South Korean rapper, singer, and songwriter. He is known for his participation in the reality competition show Produce 101 Season 2. He is a former member of boy band Rainz and currently a member of South Korean boy band WEi. Jang released his debut single album Feel Good as a solo artist in August 2019.

Career

2017-2018: Produce 101 and Rainz

In April 2017, Jang participated in Mnet's reality competition show to form a temporary boy group, Produce 101 Season 2, representing Oui Entertainment with two other trainees. He was eliminated on episode 5, finishing in 83rd overall.

On August 25, 2017, Project Rainz, an association of several agencies including Oui Entertainment, confirmed that Jang would join the debut lineup of Rainz. The group debuted in October 2017 with their first extended play Sunshine. After releasing up to four EPs, they eventually disbanded on October 28, 2018.

2019-present: Solo debut and WEi

On August 1, 2019, Oui Entertainment announced that Jang would make his debut as a solo artist with a single on August 24. After releasing some teaser photos, on August 24, Jang make his debut with the single album Feel Good which included two songs.

On June 6, 2020, Oui Entertainment confirmed that they would debut their first boy group in the second half of the year and Jang would join the lineup. On July 11, the boy group's name was revealed to be WEi. The group debuted on October 5 with their first EP, Identity: First Sight with "Twilight" as the lead single.

Discography

Single albums

Singles

Songwriting
All song credits are adapted from the Korea Music Copyright Association's database, unless otherwise noted.

Filmography

Television shows

References

External links
 

1997 births
Living people
WEi members
K-pop singers
South Korean male idols
21st-century South Korean singers
Produce 101 contestants